Shaquana Latish Quintyne (born 3 January 1996) is a Barbadian former cricketer who played as a right-arm leg break bowler. She appeared in 40 One Day Internationals and 45 Twenty20 Internationals for the West Indies between 2011 and 2016. She played domestic cricket for Barbados.

In March 2017, Quintyne suffered an injury to her right knee during a training session for the West Indies. Subsequent surgeries were unable to fix the problem, effectively ending her career.

References

External links

1996 births
Living people
West Indian women cricketers
West Indies women One Day International cricketers
West Indies women Twenty20 International cricketers
Barbadian women cricketers